Salt Lake is a natural lake in South Dakota, in the United States.

The lake water of Salt Lake has traces of alkali salts, hence the name.

See also
List of lakes in South Dakota

References

Lakes of South Dakota
Bodies of water of Campbell County, South Dakota